The Men's Greco-Roman 62 kg at the 1976 Summer Olympics as part of the wrestling program were held at the Maurice Richard Arena.

Medalists

Tournament results 
The competition used a form of negative points tournament, with negative points given for any result short of a fall. Accumulation of 6 negative points eliminated the loser wrestler. When only three wrestlers remain, a special final round is used to determine the order of the medals.

Legend
TF — Won by Fall
IN — Won by Opponent Injury
DQ — Won by Passivity
D1 — Won by Passivity, the winner is passive too
D2 — Both wrestlers lost by Passivity
FF — Won by Forfeit
DNA — Did not appear
TPP — Total penalty points
MPP — Match penalty points

Penalties
0 — Won by Fall, Technical Superiority, Passivity, Injury and Forfeit
0.5 — Won by Points, 8-11 points difference
1 — Won by Points, 1-7 points difference
2 — Won by Passivity, the winner is passive too
3 — Lost by Points, 1-7 points difference
3.5 — Lost by Points, 8-11 points difference
4 — Lost by Fall, Technical Superiority, Passivity, Injury and Forfeit

Round 1

Round 2

Round 3

Round 4

Round 5

Round 6

Round 7

Final 

Results from the preliminary round are carried forward into the final (shown in yellow).

Final standings

References

External links
Official Report

Greco-Roman 62kg